Bastian Semm (born 26 September 1979 in Bochum) is a German actor.

Life and career 
Bastian Semm was born in 1979 in Bochum and grew up there until he graduated from high school in 1999. He studied drama at the University of Music and Theatre Felix Mendelssohn Bartholdy in Leipzig and was firmly committed at the Theater Basel until 2009. He played Octavian in Shakespeare's Julius Caesar.

In 2009 he was awarded with the Rosenthal Talent Award for his portrayal of "Peer Gynt" at the Luisenburg Festival in Wunsiedel. At the Theatre of Heidelberg he was seen in the plays Lennon and East of Eden. In the summer of 2011 he played the role of Hamlet at the Bad Hersfelder Festspiele for which he gained the Hersfeld-Preis.

Since 2011 he is touring through Germany with CASH - a singer of songs a musical program on the life of actor and singer Johnny Cash

In the summer of 2012, he played again at the Luisenburg Festival, this time in the theater production of Romeo and Juliet as Romeo. Since June 2013 Bastian Semm is playing the new Störtebeker in Ralswiek on the island of Rügen at the Störtebeker Festival.

Awards 
 2009: Rosenthal Talent Award for the role of "Peer Gynt"
 2011: Hersfeld-Preis for the title role in "Hamlet"

Theater roles (selection) 
 2009: Peer Gynt (Luisenburg Festival) as Peer Gynt
 2011: Hamlet Bad Hersfelder Festspiele as Hamlet
 2012: Romeo & Juliet (Luisenburg Festival) as Romeo
 2013: Störtebeker Festival as Störtebeker

Filmography (selection) 
 2004: Das Abenteuer Freiheit
 2004: Tatort - Friedhof (TV-series)
 2004: Hallo Robbie! (TV-series)
 2005: Eine Chance für die Liebe
 2006: A City Is Blackmailed
 2014: Winnetous Sohn 
 2015: Verbotene Liebe (TV-series)

External links
 
 Homepage of Bastian Semm
 CASH - a singer of songs

References 

1979 births
Living people
21st-century German male actors
People from Bochum
German male film actors
German male stage actors
German male television actors